Television Jamaica is one of Jamaica's two major television stations. It is a subsidiary of the RJRGleaner Communications Group. Television Jamaica has a number of managers, the general manager being Claire Grant who was appointed the position in September 2012.

Programming

Television Jamaica hosts a wide range of local programmes, a few of which are Smile Jamaica, Profile, All Together Sing, Rising Stars, Magnum Kings And Queens Of Dancehall, Entertainment Report and Prime Time News. Television Jamaica also airs syndicated programs, such as The Jamie Foxx Show, George Lopez, Girlfriends, All of Us, Oshin, The Flash, Asa ga Kita,  and Empire.

Technical information
In 2022, Television Jamaica became the first in the country to broadcast in ATSC 3.0, with Kingston in January and Montego Bay in July.

See also

 CVM Television
 RJR 94 FM

References

External links
 

Television stations in Jamaica
Kingston, Jamaica
Television channels and stations established in 1997
1997 establishments in North America